Boucotte Mancagne is a settlement in Ziguinchor Department in Ziguinchor Region of the Basse Casamance area of south-west Senegal. The population of the village was estimated at 449 in 2015.

References

External links
PEPAM

Populated places in the Ziguinchor Department